The CL 16, or CL16, is a Canadian sailing dinghy that was designed by Ian Proctor, Graham Dodd and George Blanchard, as a cruiser and daysailer, and first built in 1968.

The CL 16 is a development of Proctor's 1957 Wayfarer design and is identical in dimensions and shape, with differences only in interior details. Proctor considers it an unauthorized copy.

Production
The design has been built by C&L Boatworks since 1968 in Belleville, Ontario and more recently in Fort Erie, Ontario, Canada. It remains in production.

Design
Henry Croce and Ken Lofthouse of Mahone Bay, Nova Scotia started as importers of the wooden Wayfarer, until a labour strike in the UK cut off the supply. They had the boat adapted for fibreglass construction and started their own production line as C&L. Ian Proctor considered it an unauthorized copy of the Wayfarer.

The CL 16 is a recreational sailboat, built predominantly of fibreglass, with mahogany wood trim. It has double-chined; planing hull; a fractional sloop rig; a raked stem; a plumb transom; a transom-hung, kick-up, fibreglass rudder with an aluminum head, controlled by a tiller and a retractable centreboard. Unusually for a dinghy the mainsail is equipped with one set of reefing points. The boat displaces .

A motor bracket is a factory option, to allow the boat to be fitted with a small outboard motor for docking and manoeuvring.

The boat is designed to be sailed by a crew of two, but can accommodate up to six people.

For sailing the design may be equipped with a spinnaker and a trapeze.

Operational history
In a review the Outer Harbour Centreboard Club wrote:

See also
List of sailing boat types

References

External links

Video: CL-16 sailing on Lake Ontario 2016

Dinghies
1960s sailboat type designs
Sailing yachts
Boats designed by Ian Proctor
Sailboat type designs by Graham Dodd
Sailboat type designs by George Blanchard
Sailboat types built by C&L Boatworks